Fred Dekker (5 March 1946) is a Dutch doctor, cardiologist and former politician on behalf of the Pim Fortuyn List.

Dekker is a cardiologist and worked in Belgium and the Netherlands. He was elected to parliament as a member of the Pim Fortuyn List (LPF) at the 2002 Dutch general election, but lost his seat in 2003 and left politics after.

References 

Dutch cardiologists
Dutch politicians
Pim Fortuyn List politicians
1946 births
Living people